Kvashino is a rural locality (a selo) in Solonetskoye Rural Settlement, Vorobyovsky District, Voronezh Oblast, Russia. The population was 429 as of 2010. There are 5 streets.

Geography 
Kvashino is located 9 km west of Vorobyovka (the district's administrative centre) by road. Pervomaysky is the nearest rural locality.

References 

Rural localities in Vorobyovsky District